Baima is a town under the administration of Gaogang District, Taizhou, Jiangsu, China. , it has two residential neighborhoods and five villages under its administration: It was also the founding place of the People's Liberation Army Navy.
Neighborhoods
Baima Community
Jinma Community

Villages
Chenjia Village
Lujia Village
Daibai Village
Huanghe Village
Qianjin Village

References 

Township-level divisions of Jiangsu
Taizhou, Jiangsu